Junije (Džono) Palmotić, (also Giunio in Italian or Junius Palmotta in Latin) (1606 - 1657) was a Croatian baroque writer, poet and dramatist from the Republic of Ragusa. He was a member of the Palmotić noble family.

Early life 
Palmotić was born in 1606 in Ragusa (Dubrovnik, now Croatia), the son of Juraj Palmotić (Giorgio Palmotta) and Ursula née Gradić (Orsola Gradi). His parents belonged to the notable patrician families of Palmotić and Gradić (Gradi in Italian), respectively. Through his mother, he was related to Ivan Gundulić. He had an older brother Džore and younger Ivan, who died young in his childhood.

Education 
Little is known about his schooling, but he may have attended city school as it was mandatory for male nobles. It is known that he attended a private school opened in 1619 by the Jesuits and whose lecturers included, in the next few generations, Ivan Gradić, Ignjat Tudišević, Marin Gundulić, Ivan Dražić and Bartol Kašić. As Palmotić's teachers in that school, Stjepan Gradić especially mentions Ignjat Tudišević and a Sienese Italian, Camillo Gori.

Career 
Aged 18, he became a member of the Great Council in the Republic of Ragusa. He began to write while still young, writing in continuation of the tradition of Ivan Gundulić inspired by Ovid, Virgil, Tasso and Ariosto. Although influenced by the Latin literary tradition, Palmotić wrote in his native Croatian language, as well as translating libretti from Italian. He also translated the Christias di Girolamo Vida, the Christiade, an 'Illyrian' poem in 24 verses, that was posthumously published in Rome in 1670.

Although his poetry was melodramatic and dealt primarily with mythological topics, his drama focused on contemporary Dubrovnik, particularly the life of the aristocracy. In one of his songs he demonstrates his knowledge of the Serbian epic poetry mentioning its heroes like: Lazar of Serbia, Miloš Obilić, Skanderbeg, Sekula, Mihajlo Svilojević, Vuk Grgurević and John Hunyadi.

His nephew Stjepan Gradić, ambassador and Vatican librarian, wrote about his life, supplying precious material to future biographers. Alongside Vinko Pribojević and Juraj Križanić, he was an early pioneer of the ideas of Slavic unity.

Legacy 
All the works of Palmotić were published by the end of the 19th century by the Croatian Cultural Association.
 A street in Zagreb bears his name.

Works 
Palmotić's notable works include:
 Pavlimir, drama. Narratives connected with the founding of Dubrovnik inspired his Pavlimir. This is a sort of Ragusan "Aeneid," Pavlimir corresponding to Aeneas. He comes from abroad, founds the city of Dubrovnik, marries the beautiful Margareta, whom he discovers there, and becomes otac slovenskog naroda (the father of the Slavonic people).
 Captislava, drama. The main character is the daughter of the King of Captat (Cavtat or Epidaurum). She is in love with the Hungarian prince, Gradimir, but the father wants her to marry a Serbian prince. A nymph helps her in this cabal, and she elopes with the Hungarian prince, while her sister marries the Serbian prince. Chief roles are played by ghosts and nymphs.
 Bisernica, drama. It is virtually the continuation of the Captislava, and almost all important roles are played by vilenice (nymphs) and vilenici (dragons).
 Danica, drama. A dramatized episode from Ariosto's "Orlando Furioso" (IV-VI), transplanted and acclimatized to the Bosnian and Ragusan soil. Danica is the enslaved daughter of the Bosnian king, Ostoja. She was saved by the Ragusan knight Matijas, who later became the ban of Croatia. Some motifs of this play are akin to Shakespeare's comedy Much Ado About Nothing.
 Christiade ("dedicated to the queen Cristina from Sweden")
 Atalanta, opera with music by Lambert Courtoys the Younger (1629)

In addition to his four important dramas (Pavlimir, Danica, Bisernica and Captislava) in which Palmotta celebrated the exploits of Slavic heroes, he wrote several imitations based on Latin and Italian sources. Thus the material for his Allina was taken from Ariosto, and for the Armida from Tasso. The mythological play Atalanta is based on Ovid's "Metamorphoses" (bk. X).

Annotations

References

Sources

Further reading

1606 births
1657 deaths
Ragusan writers
17th-century Croatian poets
17th-century Croatian people
Croatian dramatists and playwrights
Ragusan poets
Croatian male poets
17th-century male writers
Baroque writers
17th-century Croatian nobility